Tord Backman (born 13 November 1942) is a Swedish cross-country skier. He was part of the Swedish reserve team at the 1968 Winter Olympics. At the 1972 Games he placed 13th in the 50 km and 20th in the 15 km event.

References

External links
 

1942 births
Living people
Swedish male cross-country skiers
Olympic cross-country skiers of Sweden
Cross-country skiers at the 1972 Winter Olympics
Cross-country skiers from Norrbotten County
20th-century Swedish people